Jonne Tammela (born 5 August 1997) is a Finnish professional ice hockey forward who is currently playing for HC TPS of the Liiga. He formerly played with the Syracuse Crunch in the American Hockey League (AHL) as a prospect to the Tampa Bay Lightning of the National Hockey League (NHL).

Playing career 
On 28 October 2014, at the age of 17, Tammela made his senior Liiga debut playing with KalPa during the 2014–15 season. He was then selected by the Tampa Bay Lightning in the fourth round, 118th overall, in the 2015 NHL Entry Draft.

On 1 April 2016, Tammela signed a three-year, entry-level contract with the Tampa Bay Lightning. He returned to KalPa and played out the 2015–16 season before joining the Lightning's AHL affiliate, the Syracuse Crunch for 3 games.

In order to pursue his NHL aspirations he opted to continue his development in North American at the major junior level. He was originally the 15th import draft pick selected by the Peterborough Petes of the Ontario Hockey League in 2015. Tammela appeared in just two games with the Petes in the 2016–17 season before suffering a long-term injury.

Continuing his rehabilitation into the 2017–18 season, Tammela's junior rights were traded by the Petes to the Sault Ste. Marie Greyhounds on 9 January 2018. Upon returning to health, he re-joined the professional ranks in accepting an assignment to the Syracuse Crunch on January 12, 2018.

After bouncing between the ECHL and AHL during the 2018–19 season, his contract was terminated by the Lightning on 24 May 2019. He returned to Finland to continue his career in the Liiga, agreeing to a two-year contract with Lukko on 28 May 2019.

Career statistics

Regular season and playoffs

International

References

External links 

1997 births
Living people
Finnish ice hockey right wingers
KalPa players
Lukko players
Orlando Solar Bears (ECHL) players
Peterborough Petes (ice hockey) players
Syracuse Crunch players
Tampa Bay Lightning draft picks
HC TPS players
People from Ylivieska
Sportspeople from North Ostrobothnia